is a Japanese game designer, game director and writer. She helped Yoshitaka Murayama create the Suikoden series of role-playing video games. Initially a character designer and illustrator, she helped the series for Konami following Murayama's departure in 2002, writing and producing Suikoden IV and its spinoff title Suikoden Tactics.

Biography
A newly hired artist at Konami in 1993, Kawano was assigned to create an RPG along with writer Yoshitaka Murayama, another newcomer to the company. The project was initially intended for an internally developed video game console, which was scrapped, but it was later reopened to be included as one of Konami's first games for Sony's upcoming PlayStation console.

Kawano was not directly involved with the following two entries to the series, instead writing, producing and designing her own title, the adventure game Shadow of Memories (AKA. Shadow of Destiny in North America). It was released for the PlayStation 2 in 2001 to generally positive reviews, and later ported to Windows/PC, Xbox and PSP. Following some departures from the Suikoden team in July 2002, including series creator Murayama, just a month before the release of Suikoden III, Kawano took creative control of the series. She wrote and designed Suikoden IV in 2004 and the spinoff Suikoden Tactics in 2005, with plans for further installments on the PlayStation 3 that were never realized.

She made a spiritual successor to Shadow of Memories in 2008, titled Time Hollow, and the adventure/puzzle game Zack & Ombra: The Phantom Amusement Park in 2010, both for the Nintendo DS.

Works

References

Living people
Japanese video game designers
Year of birth missing (living people)
Women video game designers